Heterocope is a genus of copepods in the family Temoridae. It was described by Norwegian biologist Georg Ossian Sars in 1863.

Species

The World Register of Marine Species lists the following currently accepted species:

 Heterocope borealis (Fischer, 1851)
 Heterocope caspia Sars G.O., 1897
 Heterocope septentrionalis Juday & Muttkowski, 1915
 Heterocope appendiculata Sars G.O., 1863
 Heterocope saliens Lilljeborg, 1863
 Heterocope soldatovi Rylov, 1922

Additionally, the following previously considered species are now seen as synonyms of other Heterocope species:

 Heterocope alpina Sars G.O., 1863 (accepted as immature offspring of H. saliens)
 Heterocope robusta Sars G.O., 1863 (accepted as H. saliens)
 Heterocope romana Imhof, 1888 (accepted as H. saliens)
 Heterocope weismanni Imhof, 1890 (accepted as H. borealis)

References

Temoridae
Copepod genera